Aphodiini is a tribe of aphodiine dung beetles in the family Scarabaeidae. There are more than 250 genera and 2,200 described species in Aphodiini.

Genera
These 257 genera belong to the tribe Aphodiini.

 Acanthaphodius Schmidt, 1909
 Acanthobodilus Dellacasa, 1983
 Acrossidius Schmidt, 1913
 Acrossoides Schmidt, 1913
 Acrossus Mulsant, 1842
 Adeloparius Schmidt, 1913
 Afrodiapterna Dellacasa, 1984
 Afroemadiellus Bordat, 2019
 Afrotrichonotulus Bordat, 2016
 Aganocrossus Reitter, 1895
 Agoliinus Schmidt, 1913
 Agolius Mulsant & Rey, 1869
 Agrilinellus Dellacasa, Dellacasa & Gordon, 2008
 Agrilinus Mulsant & Rey, 1869
 Ahermodontus Báguena, 1930
 Aidophus (Balthasar, 1963)
 Ajmeraphodius Král, Mencl & Rakovič, 2021
 Alloblackburneus Bordat, 2009
 Allobodilus Petrovitz, 1963
 Alocoderus Schmidt, 1913
 Amidorus Mulsant, 1870
 Ammoecioides Bordat, 1999
 Ammoecius Mulsant, 1842
 Anomalurobius Paulian, 1952
 Anomius Mulsant & Rey, 1869
 Aparammoecius Petrovitz, 1958
 Aphodaulacus Koshantschikov, 1911
 Aphodiellus Schmidt, 1913
 Aphodiopsis Paulian, 1942
 Aphodius Hellwig, 1798
 Aphodobius Péringuey, 1901
 Aphodoharmogaster Endrödi, 1983
 Apsteiniella Schmidt, 1916
 Australagolius Mencl, 2008
 Australaphodius (Balthasar, 1942)
 Ballucus Gordon & Skelley, 2007
 Basilewskyanus Endrödi, 1956
 Biralus Mulsant & Rey, 1869
 Blackburneus Schmidt, 1913
 Bodiloides Dellacasa & Dellacasa, 2005
 Bodilopsis Adam, 1994
 Bodilus Mulsant & Rey, 1869
 Bosphorus Şenyüz, 2017
 Boucomontiellus Balthasar, 1932
 Brachiaphodius Koshantschikov, 1913
 Calamosternus Motschulsky, 1859
 Caligodorus Gordon & Skelley, 2007
 Calocolobopterus Dellacasa, 1984
 Candezeollus Stebnicka & Howden, 1995
 Carinaulus Tesař, 1945
 Cephalocyclus Dellacasa & Gordon & Dellacasa, 1998
 Cesamexico Koçak & Kemal, 2008
 Chilothorax Motschulsky, 1859
 Chittius Tarasov, 2008
 Cinacanthus Schmidt, 1913
 Cnemargulus Semenov, 1903
 Cnemisus Motschulsky, 1868
 Coelotrachelus Schmidt, 1913
 Colobopteridius Clement, 1958
 Colobopteroides Paulian, 1942
 Colobopterus Mulsant, 1842
 Coprimorphus Mulsant, 1842
 Coptochiroides Balthasar, 1938
 Coptochirus Harold, 1859
 Craterocyphus Schmidt, 1913
 Cryptaphodius Bordat, 2009
 Cryptoscatomaseter Gordon & Skelley, 2007
 Dellacasiellus Gordon & Skelley, 2007
 Dialytellus Brown, 1929
 Dialytes Harold, 1869
 Dialytodius Gordon & Skelley, 2007
 Diapterna Horn, 1887
 Didactylia Orbigny, 1896
 Dilortomaeus Bordat, 2009
 Doaphius Balthasar, 1941
 Drepanocanthoides Schmidt, 1913
 Drepanocanthus Péringuey, 1901
 Dudleyellus Bordat, 2009
 Emadiellus Schmidt, 1913
 Erytodes Schmidt, 1916
 Erytus Mulsant & Rey, 1870
 Esymus Mulsant & Rey, 1869
 Eudolus Mulsant & Rey, 1869
 Euhemicyclium Bordat, 2003
 Euheptaulacus Dellacasa, 1983
 Euorodalus Dellacasa, 1983
 Euotophorus Dellacasa, Gordon & Dellacasa, 2016
 Eupleurus Mulsant, 1842
 Exaphodius Endrödi, 1960
 Exoxyomus Bordat, Mencl & Rakovič, 2012
 Ferrerianus Dellacasa, Dellacasa & Gordon, 2007
 Flaviellus Gordon & Skelley, 2007
 Geomyphilus Gordon & Skelley, 2007
 Gilletianus Balthasar, 1933
 Goiginus Endrödi, 1982
 Gonaphodiellus Schmidt, 1913
 Gonaphodioides Dellacasa, Dellacasa & Gordon, 2012
 Gonaphodiopsis Dellacasa, Dellacasa & Gordon, 2012
 Gonaphodius Reitter, 1892
 Gordonius Skelley, Dellacasa & Dellacasa, 2009
 Grandinaphodius Ziani, 2002
 Guanyinaphodius Masumoto & Kiuchi, 2001
 Harmodactylus Péringuey, 1901
 Harmogaster Harold, 1861
 Haroldaphodius Bordat, 2003
 Haroldiellus Gordon & Skelley, 2007
 Hemicyclium Schmidt, 1913
 Heptaulacus Mulsant, 1842
 Hornosus Dellacasa, Dellacasa & Gordon, 2015
 Iberoaphodius Rössner, 2018
 Indoblackburneus Mencl, Král & Rakovič, 2019
 Irrasinus Gordon & Skelley, 2007
 Jalisco Dellacasa, Gordon & Dellacasa, 2003
 Karolinella Minkina, 2017
 Koreoxyomus Kim, 1996
 Koshantschikovius Schmidt, 1913
 Labarrus Mulsant & Rey, 1869
 Lechorodius Gordon & Skelley, 2007
 Limarus Mulsant & Rey, 1869
 Linargius Rakovič & Mencl, 2012
 Lindbergianus Petrovitz, 1961
 Liothorax Motschulsky, 1859
 Loboparius Schmidt, 1913
 Longaphodius Endrödi, 1980
 Loraphodius Reitter, 1892
 Loraspis Mulsant & Rey, 1869
 Lorditomaeus Péringuey, 1901
 Lunaphodius Balthasar, 1964
 Luxolinus Gordon & Skelley, 2007
 Macroretroides Bordat, Dellacasa & Dellacasa, 2000
 Macroretrus Péringuey, 1908
 Maculaphodius Gordon & Skelley, 2007
 Mecynodes Mulsant, 1870
 Megateloides Landin, 1974
 Megatelus Reitter, 1892
 Melinopterus Mulsant, 1842
 Mendidaphodius Reitter, 1901
 Mendidius Harold, 1868
 Merogyrus Gordon & Skelley, 2007
 Mesontoplatys Motschulsky, 1863
 Metoporaphodius Frolov & Akhmetova, 2017
 Microteuchestes Landin, 1974
 Mothon Semenov & Medvedev, 1927
 Mozartius Nomura & Nakane, 1951
 Neagolius Koshantschikov, 1912
 Neocalaphodius Bordat, 1990
 Neocolobopterus Landin, 1974
 Neodiapterna Dellacasa, 1984
 Neoemadiellus Clement, 1986
 Neoheptaulacus Paulian & Villiers, 1941
 Neotrichaphodioides Dellacasa, Dellacasa & Skelley, 2010
 Neotrichonotulus Dellacasa, Gordon & Dellacasa, 2004
 Nialaphodius Kolbe, 1908
 Nialosternus Hollande & Therond, 1998
 Nialus Mulsant & Rey, 1869
 Nimbus Mulsant & Rey, 1869
 Nipponaphodius Nakane, 1959
 Nipponoagoliinus Ochi & Kawahara, 2001
 Nobiellus Dellacasa & Dellacasa, 2005
 Nobius Mulsant & Rey, 1869
 Nolicus Petrovitz, 1962
 Obaphodius Bordat, 1988
 Odontacrossus Dellacasa, Král, Dellacasa & Bordat, 2014
 Odontoxyomus Král, Rakovič & Mencl, 2015
 Orammoecius Král, Rakovič & Mencl, 2016
 Orodaliscoides Schmidt, 1913
 Orodaliscus Reitter, 1900
 Oromus Mulsant & Rey, 1869
 Oscarinus Gordon & Skelley, 2007
 Osmanius Branco & Baraud, 1988
 Otophorus Mulsant, 1842
 Oxycorythus Solsky, 1876
 Oxyomoides Dellacasa, Dellacasa & Gordon, 2016
 Oxyomus Dejean, 1833
 Ozodius Skelley, 2007
 Parabodilus Hollande & Thérond, 1998
 Paracoptochirus Balthasar, 1963
 Paracrossidius Balthasar, 1932
 Paradeloparius Landin, 1959
 Paradidactylia Balthasar, 1937
 Parammoecius Seidlitz, 1891
 Paranimbus Schmidt, 1913
 Paratrichaphodius Bordat, 2013
 Pardalosus Gordon & Skelley, 2007
 Paulianellus Balthasar, 1938
 Phaeaphodius Reitter, 1892
 Phalacronothus Motschulsky, 1859
 Pharaphodius Reitter, 1892
 Pholeoaphodius Bordat, 2009
 Plagiogonus Mulsant, 1842
 Planolinellus Dellacasa & Dellacasa, 2005
 Planolinoides Dellacasa & Dellacasa, 2005
 Planolinus Mulsant & Rey, 1869
 Platyderides Schmidt, 1916
 Pleuraphodius Schmidt, 1913
 Podotenoides Paulian, 1942
 Podotenus Schmidt, 1913
 Proctophanes Harold, 1861
 Pseudacrossus Reitter, 1892
 Pseudagolius Schmidt, 1913
 Pseuderytus Hollande & Thérond, 1998
 Pseudesymus Orbigny, 1896
 Pseudoagoliinus Bordat, 1994
 Pseudoahermodontus Dellacasa & Dellacasa, 1997
 Pseudoblackburneus Bordat, 2016
 Pseudocoelotrachelus Dellacasa, Dellacasa & Gordon, 2013
 Pseudodrepanocanthus (Bordat, 1993)
 Pseudogonaphodiellus Dellacasa, Gordon & Dellacasa, 2007
 Pseudoheptaulacus Dellacasa & Dellacasa, 2000
 Pseudomothon Pittino, 1984
 Pseudopharaphodius Bordat, 1988
 Pseudopodotenus Dellacasa, 1990
 Pseudotetraclipeoides Dellacasa, Dellacasa & Gordon, 2015
 Pseudoteuchestes Dellacasa, 1986
 Pseudoxyomus Petrovitz, 1962
 Pubinus Mulsant & Rey, 1869
 Qingaphodius Král, 1997
 Renaudius Balthasar, 1951
 Rhodaphodius Adam, 1994
 Rugaphodius Gordon & Skelley, 2007
 Sahlbergianus Dellacasa & Dellacasa, 2000
 Sariangus Rakovič & Mencl, 2011
 Scabrostomus Gordon & Skelley, 2007
 Schaefferellus Gordon & Skelley, 2007
 Serraphodius Kabakov, 1996
 Setodius Gordon & Skelley, 2007
 Siamaphodius Masumoto, 1991
 Sigorus Mulsant & Rey, 1869
 Simogonius Harold, 1871
 Sinaphodius Červenka, 1994
 Sinodiapterna Dellacasa, 1986
 Sitiphus Fairmaire, 1894
 Skelleyanus Dellacasa, Dellacasa, Gordon & Stebnicka, 2011
 Sphaeraphodius Kakizoe, Jiang & Wang, 2021
 Stenotothorax Schmidt, 1913
 Strigodius Gordon & Skelley, 2007
 Subrinus Mulsant & Rey, 1869
 Sugrames Reitter, 1894
 Sussorca Paulian, 1954
 Sybax Boheman, 1857
 Symphodon Schmidt, 1913
 Tetraclipeoides Schmidt, 1913
 Teuchestes Mulsant, 1842
 Trichaphodiellus Schmidt, 1913
 Trichaphodioides Paulian, 1942
 Trichaphodius Schmidt, 1913
 Trichioaparammoecius Minkina, 2018
 Trichonotuloides Balthasar, 1945
 Trichonotulus Bedel, 1911
 Trigonoscelus (Petrovitz, 1963)
 Tristaphodius Balthasar, 1932
 Turanella Semenov, 1905
 Vladimirellus Dellacasa, Dellacasa & Bordat, 2002
 Volinus Mulsant & Rey, 1869
 Xenoheptaulacus Hinton, 1934
 Xeropsamobeus Saylor, 1937
 Youngaphodius Bordat, 1988

References

Scarabaeidae